Whitlam ministry may refer to:

 First Whitlam ministry
 Second Whitlam ministry
 Third Whitlam ministry